The far side of the Moon is the lunar hemisphere that always faces away from Earth, opposite to the near side, because of synchronous rotation in the Moon's orbit. Compared to the near side, the far side's terrain is rugged, with a multitude of impact craters and relatively few flat and dark lunar maria ("seas"), giving it an appearance closer to other barren places in the Solar System such as Mercury and Callisto. It has one of the largest craters in the Solar System, the South Pole–Aitken basin. The hemisphere is sometimes called the "dark side of the Moon", where "dark" means "unknown" instead of "lacking sunlight"  each side of the Moon experiences two weeks of sunlight while the opposite side experiences two weeks of night.

About 18 percent of the far side is occasionally visible from Earth due to libration. The remaining 82 percent remained unobserved until 1959, when it was photographed by the Soviet Luna 3 space probe. The Soviet Academy of Sciences published the first atlas of the far side in 1960. The Apollo 8 astronauts were the first humans to see the far side in person when they orbited the Moon in 1968. All crewed and uncrewed soft landings had taken place on the near side of the Moon, until 3 January 2019 when the Chang'e 4 spacecraft made the first landing on the far side.

Astronomers have suggested installing a large radio telescope on the far side, where the Moon would shield it from possible radio interference from Earth.

Definition

Tidal forces from Earth have slowed the Moon's rotation to the point where the same side is always facing the Earth—a phenomenon called tidal locking. The other face, most of which is never visible from the Earth, is therefore called the "far side of the Moon". Over time, some crescent-shaped edges of the far side can be seen due to libration. In total, 59 percent of the Moon's surface is visible from Earth at one time or another. Useful observation of the parts of the far side of the Moon occasionally visible from Earth is difficult because of the low viewing angle from Earth (they cannot be observed "full on").

A common misconception is that the Moon does not rotate on its axis. If that were so, the whole of the Moon would be visible to Earth over the course of its orbit. Instead, its rotation period matches its orbital period, meaning it turns around once for every orbit it makes: in Earth terms, it could be said that its day and its year have the same length (i.e., ~29.5 earth days).

The phrase "dark side of the Moon" does not refer to "dark" as in the absence of light, but rather "dark" as in unknown: until humans were able to send spacecraft around the Moon, this area had never been seen. In reality, both the near and far sides receive (on average) almost equal amounts of light directly from the Sun. However, the near side also receives sunlight reflected from the Earth, known as earthshine. Earthshine does not reach the area of the far side that cannot be seen from Earth.

At night under a "full Earth" the near side of the Moon receives on the order of 10 lux of illumination (about what a city sidewalk under streetlights gets; this is 34 times more light than is received on Earth under a full Moon) whereas the dark side of the Moon during the lunar night receives only about 0.001 lux of starlight. Only during a full Moon (as viewed from Earth) is the whole far side of the Moon dark.

The word dark has expanded to refer also to the fact that communication with spacecraft can be blocked while the spacecraft is on the far side of the Moon, during Apollo space missions for example.

Differences

The two hemispheres of the Moon have distinctly different appearances, with the near side covered in multiple, large maria (Latin for 'seas,' since the earliest astronomers incorrectly thought that these plains were seas of lunar water).
The far side has a battered, densely cratered appearance with few maria. Only 1% of the surface of the far side is covered by maria, compared to 31.2% on the near side. One commonly accepted explanation for this difference is related to a higher concentration of heat-producing elements on the near-side hemisphere, as has been demonstrated by geochemical maps obtained from the Lunar Prospector gamma-ray spectrometer. While other factors, such as surface elevation and crustal thickness, could also affect where basalts erupt, these do not explain why the far side South Pole–Aitken basin (which contains the lowest elevations of the Moon and possesses a thin crust) was not as volcanically active as Oceanus Procellarum on the near side.

It has also been proposed that the differences between the two hemispheres may have been caused by a collision with a smaller companion moon that also originated from the Theia collision. In this model, the impact led to an accretionary pile rather than a crater, contributing a hemispheric layer of extent and thickness that may be consistent with the dimensions of the far side highlands. However, the chemical composition of the far side is inconsistent with this model.

The far side has more visible craters. This was thought to be a result of the effects of lunar lava flows, which cover and obscure craters, rather than a shielding effect from the Earth. NASA calculates that the Earth obscures only about 4 square degrees out of 41,000 square degrees of the sky as seen from the Moon. "This makes the Earth negligible as a shield for the Moon [and] it is likely that each side of the Moon has received equal numbers of impacts, but the resurfacing by lava results in fewer craters visible on the near side than the far side, even though both sides have received the same number of impacts."

Newer research suggests that heat from Earth at the time when the Moon was formed is the reason the near side has fewer impact craters. The lunar crust consists primarily of plagioclases formed when aluminium and calcium condensed and combined with silicates in the mantle. The cooler far side experienced condensation of these elements sooner and so formed a thicker crust; meteoroid impacts on the near side would sometimes penetrate the thinner crust here and release basaltic lava that created the maria, but would rarely do so on the far side.

Exploration

Early exploration

Until the late 1950s, little was known about the far side of the Moon. Librations periodically allowed limited glimpses of features near the lunar limb on the far side, but only up to 59% of the total surface of the Moon. These features, however, were seen from a low angle, hindering useful observation (it proved difficult to distinguish a crater from a mountain range). The remaining 82% of the surface on the far side remained unknown, and its properties were subject to much speculation.

An example of a far side feature that can be seen through libration is the Mare Orientale, which is a prominent impact basin spanning almost , yet this was not even named as a feature until 1906, by Julius Franz in Der Mond. The true nature of the basin was discovered in the 1960s when rectified images were projected onto a globe. The basin was photographed in fine detail by Lunar Orbiter 4 in 1967.

Before space exploration began, astronomers did not expect that the far side would be different from the side visible to Earth. On 7 October 1959, the Soviet probe Luna 3 took the first photographs of the lunar far side, eighteen of them resolvable, covering one-third of the surface invisible from the Earth. The images were analysed, and the first atlas of the far side of the Moon was published by the USSR Academy of Sciences on 6 November 1960. It included a catalog of 500 distinguished features of the landscape. 

In 1961, the first globe (1: scale) containing lunar features invisible from the Earth was released in the USSR, based on images from Luna 3. On 20 July 1965, another Soviet probe, Zond 3, transmitted 25 pictures of very good quality of the lunar far side, with much better resolution than those from Luna 3. In particular, they revealed chains of craters, hundreds of kilometers in length, but, unexpectedly, no mare plains like those visible from Earth with the naked eye. 

In 1967, the second part of the Atlas of the Far Side of the Moon was published in Moscow, based on data from Zond 3, with the catalog now including 4,000 newly discovered features of the lunar far side landscape. In the same year, the first Complete Map of the Moon (1: scale) and updated complete globe (1: scale), featuring 95 percent of the lunar surface, were released in the Soviet Union.

As many prominent landscape features of the far side were discovered by Soviet space probes, Soviet scientists selected names for them. This caused some controversy, and the International Astronomical Union, leaving many of those names intact, later assumed the role of naming lunar features on this hemisphere.

Further survey mission
On 26 April 1962, NASA's Ranger 4 space probe became the first spacecraft to impact the far side of the Moon, although it failed to return any scientific data before impact.

The first truly comprehensive and detailed mapping survey of the far side was undertaken by the American uncrewed Lunar Orbiter program launched by NASA from 1966 to 1967. Most of the coverage of the far side was provided by the final probe in the series, Lunar Orbiter 5.

The far side was first seen directly by human eyes during the Apollo 8 mission in December, 1968. Astronaut William Anders described the view:

It has been seen by all 24 men who flew on Apollo 8 and Apollo 10 through Apollo 17, and photographed by multiple lunar probes. Spacecraft passing behind the Moon were out of direct radio communication with the Earth, and had to wait until the orbit allowed transmission. During the Apollo missions, the main engine of the Service Module was fired when the vessel was behind the Moon, producing some tense moments in Mission Control before the craft reappeared.

Geologist-astronaut Harrison Schmitt, who became the last to step onto the Moon, had aggressively lobbied for his landing site to be on the far side of the Moon, targeting the lava-filled crater Tsiolkovskiy. Schmitt's ambitious proposal included a special communications satellite based on the existing TIROS satellites to be launched into a Farquhar–Lissajous halo orbit around the L2 point so as to maintain line-of-sight contact with the astronauts during their powered descent and lunar surface operations. NASA administrators rejected these plans on the grounds of added risk and lack of funding.

The idea of utilizing Earth–Moon  for communications satellite covering the Moon's far side has been realized, as China National Space Administration launched Queqiao relay satellite in 2018. It has since been used for communications between the Chang'e 4 lander and Yutu 2 rover that have successfully landed in early 2019 on the lunar far side and ground stations on the Earth.  And L2 is proposed to be "an ideal location" for a propellant depot as part of the proposed depot-based space transportation architecture.

Soft landing

The China National Space Administration's Chang'e 4 achieved humanity's first ever soft landing on the lunar far side on 3 January 2019 and deployed Yutu-2 lunar rover onto far side lunar surface.

The craft included a lander equipped with a low-frequency radio spectrograph and geological research tools. The far side of the Moon provides a good environment for radio astronomy as interferences from the Earth are blocked by the Moon.

In February 2020, Chinese astronomers reported, for the first time, a high-resolution image of a lunar ejecta sequence, and, as well, direct analysis of its internal architecture. These were based on observations made by the Lunar Penetrating Radar (LPR) on board the Yutu-2 rover.

The Lunar Surface Electromagnetics Experiment (LuSEE-Night) lander, a mission to soft land as early as 2026 a robotic observatory on the far side designed to measure electromagnetic waves from the early history of the universe is being developed by NASA and the United States Department of Energy.

Potential uses and missions

Because the far side of the Moon is shielded from radio transmissions from the Earth, it is considered a good location for placing radio telescopes for use by astronomers. Small, bowl-shaped craters provide a natural formation for a stationary telescope similar to Arecibo in Puerto Rico. For much larger-scale telescopes, the  crater Daedalus is situated near the center of the far side, and the  rim would help to block stray communications from orbiting satellites. Another potential candidate for a radio telescope is the Saha crater.

Before deploying radio telescopes to the far side, several problems must be overcome. The fine lunar dust can contaminate equipment, vehicles, and space suits. The conducting materials used for the radio dishes must also be carefully shielded against the effects of solar flares. Finally, the area around the telescopes must be protected against contamination by other radio sources.

The force of this impact has created a deep penetration into the lunar surface, and a sample returned from this site could be analyzed for information concerning the interior of the Moon.

Because the near side is partly shielded from the solar wind by the Earth, the far side maria are expected to have the highest concentration of helium-3 on the surface of the Moon. This isotope is relatively rare on the Earth, but has good potential for use as a fuel in fusion reactors. Proponents of lunar settlement have cited the presence of this material as a reason for developing a Moon base.

Named features

 Aitken (crater)
 Amici (crater)
 Anuchin (crater)
 Apollo (crater)
 Avogadro (crater)
 Bel'kovich (crater)
 Belopol'skiy (crater)
 Bergstrand (crater)
 Berkner (crater)
 Birkhoff (crater)
 Bjerknes (lunar crater)
 Bok (lunar crater)
 Campbell (lunar crater)
 Cantor (crater)
 Carnot (crater)
 Cassegrain (crater)
 Chandler (crater)
 Chappell (crater)
 Chernyshev (crater)
 Comrie (crater)
 Coulomb-Sarton Basin
 Crookes (crater)
 d'Alembert (crater)
 Daedalus (crater)
 Davisson (crater)
 Delporte (crater)
 Dyson (crater)
 Ellerman (crater)
 Emden (crater)
 Esnault-Pelterie (crater)
 Finsen (crater)
 Fleming (crater)
 Fowler (crater)
 Fridman (crater)
 Gerasimovich (crater)
 Gullstrand (crater)
 Hayn (crater)
 Hegu (crater)
 Hertzsprung (crater)
 H. G. Wells (crater)
 Hippocrates (lunar crater)
 Houzeau (crater)
 Icarus (crater)
 Ioffe (crater)
 Izsak (crater)
 Jenner (crater)
 Kamerlingh Onnes (crater)
 Kirkwood (crater)
 Klute (crater)
 Kolhörster (crater)
 Komarov (crater)
 Korolev (lunar crater)
 Kovalevskaya (crater)
 Kugler (crater)
 Kulik (crater)
 Lamb (crater)
 Lacus Luxuriae
 Lacus Oblivionis
 Lander (crater)
 Langevin (crater)
 Lebedev (crater)
 Leibnitz (crater)
 Lucretius (crater)
 Lunar south pole
 Maksutov (crater)
 McKellar (crater)
 Mare Australe
 Mare Frigoris
 Mare Humboldtianum
 Mare Ingenii
 Mare Moscoviense
 Mare Orientale
 Mendeleev (crater)
 Michelson (crater)
 Montes Cordillera
 Montes Rook
 Mons Tai
 Nicholson (lunar crater)
 Nishina (crater)
 Ohm (crater)
 Oppenheimer (crater)
 Oresme (crater)
 Pannekoek (crater)
 Paraskevopoulos (crater)
 Parenago (crater)
 Patsaev (crater)
 Perrine (crater)
 Pettit (lunar crater)
 Pirquet (crater)
 Pogson (crater)
 Priestley (lunar crater)
 Quetelet (crater)
 Rowland (crater)
 Sarton (crater)
 Schlesinger (crater)
 Shaler (crater)
 Shternberg (crater)
 Shuleykin (crater)
 Sniadecki (crater)
 Sommerfeld (crater)
 South Pole–Aitken basin
 Statio Tianhe
 Stebbins (crater)
 Stoletov (crater)
 Sverdrup (crater)
 Tianjin (crater)
 Tikhov (lunar crater)
 Titov (crater)
 Tsinger (crater)
 Tsiolkovskiy (crater)
 Tyndall (lunar crater)
 Vallis Bouvard
 Vallis Inghirami
 van't Hoff (crater)
 Van der Waals (crater)
 Vavilov (crater)
 Vertregt (crater)
 Volkov (crater)
 Von Kármán (lunar crater)
 Von Zeipel (crater)
 Wan-Hoo (crater)
 Wiener (crater)
 Wright (lunar crater)
 Yamamoto (crater)
 Zhinyu (crater)

See also
 Geology of the Moon
 Giant-impact hypothesis
 Near side of the Moon

References

External links
 Lunar and Planetary Institute: Exploring the Moon
 NASA takes first video of dark side of the Moon
 Lunar and Planetary Institute: Lunar Atlases
 Ralph Aeschliman Planetary Cartography and Graphics: Lunar Maps 
 Full Moon Atlas: Lunar Far Side at lunarrepublic.com
 Northwest Africa 482, only meteorite believed to have originated from the far side of the Moon
 Moon articles in Planetary Science Research Discoveries
 
 LIFE magazine (Nov. 9, 1959) article about first photos.

Lunar science
Hemispheres of Moon